Ramal de Braga is a branch line in Portugal, which connects  on the Linha do Minho, with . It was opened on 21 May 1875. and modernised in 2004.

See also 
 List of railway lines in Portugal
 List of Portuguese locomotives and railcars
 History of rail transport in Portugal

References

Sources

 

Bra
Iberian gauge railways
Railway lines opened in 1875